Chiswick ferry wharf is located on the southern side of the Parramatta River serving the Sydney suburb of Chiswick. It served by Sydney Ferries Parramatta River services operating between Circular Quay and Parramatta. The single wharf is served by First Fleet and RiverCat class ferries.

Wharves & services

Interchanges
Transit Systems operate three bus routes to and from Chiswick wharf:
415: to Campsie station
504: to The Domain 
504X: to Town Hall station

References

External links

Chiswick Wharf at Transport for New South Wales (Archived 11 June 2019)
Chiswick Wharf Local Area Map Transport for NSW

Ferry wharves in Sydney